Anwar ul Haq Kakar is a Pakistani politician who has been a Member of the Senate of Pakistan, since March 2018.

Political career
Kakar was elected to the Senate of Pakistan as an independent candidate on general seat from Balochistan in 2018 Pakistani Senate election. He took oath as Senator on 12 March 2018.

He co-launched a new political party Balochistan Awami Party (BAP).

References

Living people
Place of birth missing (living people)
Year of birth missing (living people)
Members of the Senate of Pakistan